Jung-dong or Jungdong can refer to several administrative wards in South Korean cities or countries:

 Jung-dong, Mapo-gu, Seoul
 Jung-dong, Haeundae-gu, Busan
 Jung-dong, Suseong-gu, Daegu
 Jung-dong, Dong-gu, Daejeon
 Jung-dong, Wonmi-gu, Bucheon City, Gyeonggi-do
 Jung-dong, Paldal-gu, Suwon City, Gyeonggi-do
 Jung-dong, Giheung-gu, Yongin City, Gyeonggi-do
 Jung-dong, Gongju City, Chungcheongnam-do
 Jung-dong, Gunsan City, Jeollabuk-do
 Jung-dong, Wansan-gu, Jeongju City, Jeollabuk-do
 Jung-dong, Gwangyang City, Jeollanam-do
 Jung-dong, Mokpo City, Jeollanam-do
 Jung-dong, Uichang-gu, Changwon City, Gyeongsangnam-do
 Jungdong-myeon, Yeongwol, Gangwon-do
 Jungdong-myeon, Sangju City, Gyeongsangbuk-do